Clubiona pseudoneglecta is a sac spider species found from Europe to Central Asia. It has been found in sandpits and lives in steppe habitat.

See also 
 List of Clubionidae species

References

External links 

Clubionidae
Spiders of Asia
Spiders of Europe
Spiders described in 1994